Michael Easley may refer to:
Michael J. Easley (born 1957), president of Moody Bible Institute 2005–2008
Michael F. Easley Jr., American lawyer
Mike Easley (born 1950), governor of North Carolina 2001–2009